Isla Coronado, occasionally referred to as “Smith Island”, is just off the eastern shoreline of Mexico's Baja California Peninsula near Bahía de los Ángeles in the Gulf of California. The island is approximately 7 kilometers long and it is dominated by a volcano on its northern end. It is part of the Ensenada Municipality.

Environment
Isla Coronado — similar to nearby Isla Coronadito, Isla Mitlan and Isla Calavera - has an arid climate and is sparsely vegetated. Despite the harshness of the environment, sea lion colonies can be found on the island. Partly in response to increased environmental pressure on the islands from both fishing and tourism, local groups developed a management and conservation plan for the islands in the bay, with international support, in the late 1990s.

Volcano

Coronado is a  volcano on the island. The date of the last eruption of the volcano is not known, but gas and steam activity was last recorded in 1539.

Biology
The island has seven species of reptiles: Aspidoscelis tigris (tiger whiptail), Callisaurus draconoides (zebra-tailed lizard), Crotalus mitchellii (speckled rattlesnake), Hypsiglena ochrorhyncha (coast night snake), Phyllodactylus nocticolus (peninsular leaf-toed gecko), Sauromalus hispidus (spiny chuckwalla), and Uta stansburiana (common side-blotched lizard).

Marine life
The island is an important piece of the ecology of the Gulf of California. In 1940, marine biologist Ed Ricketts, together with his friend, author John Steinbeck, conducted an expedition and collecting trip in the Gulf of California (sometimes known as the Sea of Cortez) to explore the rich ecology of the intertidal zone. Coronado Island and the Bahía de los Ángeles were part of that expedition. The resulting book by Steinbeck and Ricketts, The Log from the Sea of Cortez, remains a classic document of the natural history and ecology of the Gulf of California.
Today, the uninhabited island is a refuge with a rich marine assemblage, especially when compared to other, unprotected parts of the Gulf. This image provides hints of the diverse marine environment around the island. Most of the coast is steep and rocky, but lighter blue lagoons, especially along the western coast, provide shallower, protected environments that are biologically robust. Offshore, internal waves and complex surface currents facilitate mixing of the water, important for nutrient delivery to the coastal environments. These water patterns are outlined by sunglint (light reflecting off of the water surface back towards the camera on board the International Space Station). The sunglint patterns are due to wind and currents, which roughen the water surface and enhance reflection, and surfactants that decrease the surface tension and roughness, resulting in regions of dark, smooth water.

References

External links
http://herpatlas.sdnhm.org/places/overview/isla-smith/117/1/

Coronado Island and the Gulf of California, Mexico. This article incorporates text from this public domain NASA webpage.
Full-size image of Coronado Island, from NASA's Earth Observatory.

Further reading
Steinbeck, John. Ricketts, Edward F. (1941). Sea of Cortez: A leisurely journal of travel and research, with a scientific appendix comprising materials for a source book on the marine animals of the Panamic faunal province. Reprinted by Paul P Appel Pub. 1971.

External links

Islands of Baja California
Islands of the Gulf of California
Islands of Ensenada Municipality
Uninhabited islands of Mexico
Volcanoes of Baja California
Nature reserves in Mexico
Protected areas of Baja California
Landforms of Baja California